The Drowsy Chaperone is a Canadian musical with music and lyrics by Lisa Lambert and Greg Morrison, and a book by Bob Martin and Don McKellar.

The story concerns a middle-aged, asocial musical theater fan who, feeling "blue", decides to play for the audience an LP of his favorite musical, the fictional 1928 show The Drowsy Chaperone. As the record plays, the show - a parody of 1920s American musical comedy - comes to life onstage, as the man wryly comments on the music, story and actors.

The Drowsy Chaperone debuted in 1998 at The Rivoli in Toronto, and, after a 2005 run in Los Angeles, opened on Broadway on May 1, 2006. The show was nominated for multiple Broadway and West End theatre awards, winning five Tony Awards and seven Drama Desk Awards. The show has had major productions in Toronto, Los Angeles, New York, London, Melbourne and Japan, as well as two North American tours as well as Batemans Bay in south eastern Australia.

History 
The Drowsy Chaperone started in 1997, when Don McKellar, Lisa Lambert, Greg Morrison and several friends created a spoof of old musicals for the stag party of Bob Martin and Janet van de Graaf. In its first incarnation, there was no Man in Chair, the musical styles ranged from the 1920s to the 1940s, and the jokes were more risqué. When the show was reshaped for the Toronto Fringe Festival, Martin became a co-writer, creating Man in Chair to serve as a narrator/commentator for the piece.

Following the Fringe staging, Toronto commercial theatre producer David Mirvish financed an expanded production at Toronto's 160-seat, independent Theatre Passe Muraille in 1999. Box office success and favourable notices led Mirvish in 2001 to finance further development and produce a full-scale version at Toronto's 1000-seat Winter Garden Theatre. During that production, Linda Intaschi, Associate Producer of Mirvish Productions, invited New York producer Roy Miller to see the musical. Miller saw potential in the show and he optioned the rights.

With Canadian actor and fund-raiser Paul Mack, Miller produced a reading for the New York's National Alliance for Musical Theatre on 5 October 2004 – and invited Broadway producer Kevin McCollum. The reading captured McCollum's interest and eventually resulted in Miller, McCollum and Bob Boyett, Stephanie McClelland, Barbara Freitag and Jill Furman committing to producing the play. An out-of-town engagement followed at the Ahmanson Theatre in Los Angeles (2005), and after alterations, The Drowsy Chaperone opened on Broadway on 1 May 2006.

Productions

Broadway
The Broadway production opened in May 2006 at the Marquis Theatre. It was directed and choreographed by Casey Nicholaw. The production featured sets by David Gallo, costumes by Gregg Barnes, lighting by Ken Billington and Brian Monahan, hair by Josh Marquette, and makeup by Justen M. Brosnan. The original cast featured Bob Martin as the Man in Chair, Sutton Foster as Janet, Georgia Engel as Mrs. Tottendale, Edward Hibbert as Underling, and Beth Leavel as the Chaperone. Throughout the course of the show, replacements for the Man in Chair included Jonathan Crombie, Bob Saget, and John Glover. Upon Engel's exit from the production, Jo Anne Worley and Cindy Williams became replacements for Mrs. Tottendale, Mara Davi assumed the role of Janet once Foster left, and Peter Bartlett took over for Hibbert.

In his mixed review of the show, New York Times critic Ben Brantley said that the show "...seems poised to become the sleeper of the Broadway season, [though] it is not any kind of masterpiece," and that "...all the songs, while serviceably imitative of the 1920's, are forgettable." In a slightly more enthusiastic review, Variety's David Benedict noted that "The secret behind the success of Casey Nicholaw's exquisitely honed hymn to the forgotten musicals of yesteryear is that its authors knew exactly what they were doing when they took the broad out of Broadway."

Despite the mixed reviews, The Drowsy Chaperone was nominated for 13 Tony Awards, including Best Musical. It won five including Best Original Score, Best Book of a Musical, and Best Featured Actress in a Musical for Leavel.

The production closed on 30 December 2007 after 674 performances and 32 previews.

West End
The Broadway team staged the West End production. Previews started on 14 May 2007, first night was on 6 June, but it closed on 4 August after fewer than 100 performances.  A largely British cast, including Elaine Paige – making her return to the West End after six years – John Partridge and Summer Strallen joined the show's co-author Bob Martin recreating his Broadway role of "Man in Chair", with Anne Rogers, Nickolas Grace, Nick Holder, Selina Chilton and Adam Stafford. Later during the run, TV star Steve Pemberton took over the role of "Man in Chair". Novello Theatre's owner Sir Cameron Mackintosh, who had seen the show in previews in New York had supported its transatlantic transfer.

London's critics generally gave positive reviews of the show, although some were less impressed. An early drastic reduction in the cost of premium seating for the show failed to generate sufficient enthusiasm for the production, and the producers closed it in August instead of the scheduled February 2008 date. The Stage commented, "shows in London can run safely ... at lower capacities than they require on Broadway. ... But, as the transfer of The Drowsy Chaperone has just proved, sometimes even a Tony-winning Broadway hit can't even achieve that." The production received 2008 Olivier Award nominations for Best New Musical, Best Actress in a Musical (Strallen), Best Actor in a Musical (Martin), Best Theatre Choreographer (Casey Nicholaw), and Best Costume Design (Gregg Barnes).

North American tour
A national tour of The Drowsy Chaperone opened 19 September 2007 in Toronto at the Elgin Theatre.  Among the performers were original Broadway cast members Bob Martin and Georgia Engel.  While Engel performed with the company for the extended engagement, Martin did not continue beyond Toronto; his role was taken over by Jonathan Crombie. Nancy Opel played the role of "The Drowsy Chaperone". The Drowsy Chaperone played more than 30 cities in the United States, including Los Angeles at the Ahmanson Theatre, where the show ran before going to Broadway.

Subsequent North American productions
The Vancouver Playhouse Theatre Company mounted an independent production of The Drowsy Chaperone directed by Max Reimer, musical-directed by Lloyd Nicholson and choreographed by Dayna Tekatch in Vancouver, British Columbia. It opened 27 November 2008 and ran until 27 December 2008. The cast of this version included Jay Brazeau, Thom Allison, Debbie Timuss, Laird Mackintosh, Gabrielle Jones, Neil Minor, Shawn Macdonald, Mark Burgess, Nathalie Marable, Nora McLellan and David Marr.

In July 2009 the Thousand Islands Playhouse mounted another independent production, directed by Kathryn Mackay, choreographed by Dayna Tekatch, with musical direction by Sandy Thorburn.

In co-production with Canada's National Arts Centre English Theatre, the Vancouver Playhouse Theatre Company's production of The Drowsy Chaperone directed by Max Reimer played on the Shoctor stage of the Citadel Theatre in Edmonton, Alberta, opening on 5 September and closing on 4 October (2009) and thereafter played at the National Arts Centre though 1 November 2009; however, musical director Lloyd Nicholson died of a heart attack on the eve of the first performance in Ottawa, causing the production's run in that city to be truncated slightly as a couple of early performances were cancelled.

On 7 January 2010 the Manitoba Theatre Centre in Winnipeg opened its co-production with Theatre Calgary, with Calgary dates set for the following season. The show will be produced by Medicine Hat Musical Theatre in April 2016.

The Drowsy Chaperone ran 30 June – 11 July 2015 at the Cape Playhouse in Dennis, Massachusetts with Jo Anne Worley reprising her Broadway role of Mrs. Tottendale: the cast also included Simon Jones as the Man in the Chair and Bill Nolte as Feldzieg. The review of this production posted 12 July 2015 at BroadwayWorld.com stated "The Drowsy Chaperone is one of those shows that is inherently comical in its nature: it is literally laugh-out-loud funny, portraying the lives and actions of each of its characters as almost too absurd to be believed....The Drowsy Chaperone is really a beautiful show that is saturated with singing, dancing, some very odd characters and an almost too-simple plot that makes this show awesome."

The show played at the Goodspeed Opera House in Haddam, Connecticut from September to 25 November 2018.

International productions
The first translated production of the musical opened in Japan on 5 January 2009.

The Australian production, staged by the Melbourne Theatre Company, opened for a limited engagement in Melbourne on 21 January 2010. Prominent Australian actor Geoffrey Rush played Man in Chair. The production was announced to run through 20 February, but due to impressively high demand for tickets when they were first made available, the producers arranged for it to continue through 27 February.

Ovation Productions and Alex Segal presented a production at Upstairs at the Gatehouse directed by Racky Plews, musical supervisor Michael England, choreographed by Fabian Aloise.  23 September – 31 October 2010.

The Drowsy Chaperone was first translated to Portuguese in 2013, and performed from 17 August 2013 to 29 June 2014 in São Paulo city. In the cast there were popular Brazilian musical actors such as Ivan Parente, Sara Sarres, Stella Miranda, Saulo Vasconcelos, Kiara Sasso and Andrezza Massei. It was staged on Teatro Popular do SESI, and it was the first time a musical show had free tickets, due to sponsorship.

Synopsis

Act I
Man in Chair, a mousy, agoraphobic Broadway fanatic, seeking to cure his "non-specific sadness", listens to a recording of the fictional 1928 musical comedy, The Drowsy Chaperone. As he listens to this rare recording, the characters appear in his dingy apartment, and it is transformed into an impressive Broadway set with seashell footlights, sparkling furniture, painted backdrops, and glitzy costumes. Man in Chair provides a running commentary throughout the show from the stage, though he is on the audience side of the fourth wall, invisible to the players.

In the opening number, "Fancy Dress", the premise and characters of the show are introduced: it's the day of the wedding of oil tycoon Robert Martin and Broadway star Janet Van De Graaff, who plans to give up her career for married life. Those in attendance include aging hostess Mrs. Tottendale; her loyal employee known only as Underling; Robert's best man, George; Broadway producer Feldzieg, who is hoping to persuade Janet to forgo marriage and continue starring in Feldzieg's Follies; ditzy flapper Kitty, who hopes to take Janet's place in the Follies; two gangsters disguised as pastry chefs; self-proclaimed famed Latin lover Aldolpho; Janet's alcoholic Chaperone, who is supposed to keep her away from Robert until the wedding; and Trix, an aviatrix.

The gangsters reveal to Feldzieg that their boss has invested in the Follies and wants to make sure the show is a financial success, which it presumably will not be without Janet. They tell Feldzieg that he must sabotage the wedding and make sure Janet stays in show business. Feldzieg enlists the vain, easily manipulated Aldolpho to seduce Janet and spoil her relationship with Robert. Meanwhile, in his room, Robert realizes that he is nervous about the wedding. To get rid of his "Cold Feets", he tap dances, and George, who is also nervous, joins in the dance. George notes that tap dancing could be injurious, so he suggests that Robert go roller skating in the garden instead, while wearing a blindfold to keep him from seeing Janet. Outside by the pool, Janet tells reporters that she is happy to be getting married and ostensibly doesn't want to be an actress anymore ("Show Off"), but her song evolves into a big production number.

In Janet's room, Janet is having doubts about whether Robert really loves her, and she asks the Chaperone for advice. The Chaperone responds with the extemporaneous "As We Stumble Along", a "rousing anthem to alcoholism", which, Man in Chair explains, the original actress playing the Chaperone insisted on including in the show. More helpfully, the chaperone tells Janet that she is feeling "drowsy" and must take a nap, giving Janet the opportunity to ask Robert if he loves her. Janet leaves for the garden, and Aldolpho enters, mistaking the Chaperone for Janet. The Chaperone happily pretends to be Janet and allows Aldolpho to "seduce" her ("I Am Aldolpho"). Janet meets the blindfolded and roller-skating Robert in the garden, and she pretends to be a French woman, "Mimi," "from ze middle part [of France], where zey make ze toast." She asks Robert how he met his bride, and he describes their lovestruck first meeting ("Accident Waiting to Happen"). Carried away by his emotions, Robert kisses "Mimi" because she seems just like Janet. Janet furiously storms off because Robert has "kissed a strange French girl".

Kitty, hoping to take Janet's place in the Follies, tries to demonstrate her mind-reading talents to Feldzieg, but he is unimpressed. The gangsters confront Feldzieg, threatening him with a murderous "Toledo Surprise" because he has not yet succeeded in cancelling the wedding. Feldzieg distracts them by insisting that they actually have singing and dancing talent, and they turn "Toledo Surprise" into an upbeat dance number. Aldolpho, with the Chaperone on his arm, announces that he has seduced the bride and the wedding is therefore cancelled, but Feldzieg angrily tells him he has seduced the wrong woman. Janet announces that she is cancelling the wedding, and Robert protests in vain that he only kissed "Mimi" because she reminded him of Janet ("Toledo Surprise").

Man in Chair announces that this is the end of the first act and the first record of the two-record set.

Act II
Man in Chair puts on another record, saying that the audience can listen to the opening of the second act of The Drowsy Chaperone, and leaves for the restroom. A scene set in an oriental palace appears onstage, with characters in stereotypical oriental costumes and the chaperone costumed as an Englishwoman in a hoopskirted dress ("Message from A Nightingale"). Man in Chair hurriedly stops the record, explaining to the audience that that was the wrong record—it was the musical The Enchanted Nightingale, not the second act of The Drowsy Chaperone. He finds the right record, and The Drowsy Chaperone continues.

In a musical dream sequence, Janet laments her lost romance and decides to return to the stage ("Bride's Lament"). Mrs. Tottendale tells Underling that the wedding will proceed as planned because "Love is Always Lovely" in the end. She reveals to Underling that she is in love with him ("Love is Always Lovely in the End"). The Chaperone announces that there will be a wedding after all: she and Aldolpho are getting married (which Aldolpho helplessly protests). Mrs. Tottendale announces that she and Underling are getting married as well.

Robert tells Janet that he loves her, and Man in Chair announces that one of his favorite parts is coming up. The chaperone gives Janet advice on what to do as Aldolpho drops his cane and the Chaperone says "l-ve while you can," leaving out the middle syllable of the word. Man in Chair has an emotional monologue where he expresses his wonderment about the phrase, asking if it says "live while you can," or "leave while you can." He shares a brief backstory about his unsuccessful marriage and about how you should never leave, only live. The scene transforms back to Janet where she admits that she was really the French girl and agrees to marry him. To appease the gangsters, Feldzieg tells them that he has discovered a new star: Kitty. He asks her to demonstrate her mind-reading talent, and when she "reads Feldzieg's mind", she announces that he is asking her to marry him.

George, now best man for all four weddings, realizes that he has failed at his most important task: finding a minister. Trix lands her plane in the garden, announcing she is about to depart for Rio. Because a captain on board a ship can perform marriages, everyone rationalizes that Trix, as a pilot, can perform marriages on board a plane, and she can fly them all to Rio for their honeymoons ("I Do, I Do in the Sky").

As the record is about to play the show's final chord, the power goes out in Man in Chair's apartment, and a superintendent arrives to check the circuit breakers. The power returns, the final chord plays, and the show is over.  Alone again, Man in Chair sadly expresses his deep love for a musical that he has never actually seen.  He begins to sing "As We Stumble Along" and the cast members, for the first time, acknowledge his presence, join in, and cheer him on ("As We Stumble Along (Reprise)").

Musical numbers
Overture – Orchestra
Fancy Dress –Tottendale, Underling, Company
Cold Feets – Robert, George
Show Off – Janet, Company
As We Stumble Along – Drowsy Chaperone, Ensemble
I Am Aldolpho – Aldolpho, Drowsy Chaperone
Accident Waiting To Happen – Robert, Janet
Toledo Surprise – Gangsters, Feldzieg, Kitty, Mrs. Tottendale, and Company
Message From A Nightingale – Kitty, Gangsters, Aldolpho, Drowsy Chaperone
Bride's Lament – Janet, Company
Love Is Always Lovely in the End – Mrs. Tottendale, Underling
I Do, I Do in the Sky – Trix, Company
As We Stumble Along (Reprise) – Company

The original cast recording contains two bonus tracks titled, "I Remember Love," which is a duet between Mrs. Tottendale and Underling, and "Message From A Nightingale", which is the unabridged version of a portion of a song that is cut short in the show. "I Remember Love" also contains a ukulele solo by Ukulele Lil as Mrs. Tottendale. It was replaced by "Love is Always Lovely in the End."

Cast recording 
A one-disc compact disc by the original Broadway cast was released in 2006.

Principal roles and casting

 Notable replacements (Broadway)
 Jo Anne Worley and Cindy Williams as Mrs. Tottendale
 Mara Davi as Janet van de Graaff
 Peter Bartlett as Underling
 Jonathan Crombie, Bob Saget, and John Glover as Man in Chair
 Notable replacement (London)
 Steve Pemberton replaced Bob Martin in the role of Man in Chair from 10 July until the production closed on 4 August.

Notable replacement (North American Tour)

 Jonathan Crombie as Man in Chair (Crombie replaced Martin after the tour's launch in Martin's hometown Toronto)

Show-within-a-show structure
The concept that the audience is listening to the musical on an old LP record is used throughout the show. As he listens to the show, Man in Chair is torn between his desire to absorb every moment of the show as it unfolds and his need to insert his personal footnotes and his extensive-but-trivial knowledge of musical performances and actors, as he frequently brings the audience in and out of the fantasy. As the show goes on, more of his personal life is revealed through his musings about the show, until, as the record ends, he is left again alone in his apartment – but still with his record of a long-beloved show to turn to whenever he's blue.

At one point, the record skips, which causes the last notes (and dance steps) of a song to be repeated until the Man in Chair bumps the turntable. A "power outage" near the end causes the stage to go dark in the middle of the big production number. Despite the show-within-the-show being a two-act musical, The Drowsy Chaperone is played without an intermission; at the end of the "show"'s first act, the Man in Chair observes that there would be an intermission "if we were sitting in the Morosco Theatre, watching The Drowsy Chaperone. Which we're not."  (In the original Broadway production, he added, "They tore it down and put up a hotel," an in-joke reference to the fact that the show was playing in the Marquis Theatre, part of the Marriott Marquis complex built on the spot where the Morosco stood). His monologue at the musical's intermission point ends when he changes records (ostensibly preparing the turntable to play the musical's second act), then leaves the stage "to use the bathroom".  The new record is actually the second act of a different musical by the same composer and librettist, starring many of the same actors. Message from a Nightingale is performed in costumes evoking Imperial China, with the performers displaying clichéd Chinese accents and mannerisms.  The Man in Chair returns to the stage and replaces the record with the correct one for Act II of The Drowsy Chaperone.

Parodies of musical comedy 

The plot incorporates mistaken identities, dream sequences, spit takes, a deus ex machina, an unflappable English butler, an absent-minded dowager, a Broadway impresario and his Follies production, comic gangsters, a ditzy chorine, a harried best man, and Janet's "Drowsy" (i.e. "tipsy") Chaperone, played in the show-within-a-show by a blowzy Grande Dame of the Stage, specializing in "rousing anthems" and not above upstaging the occasional co-star.

Awards and nominations

Original Broadway production

Original London production

Film adaptation
On 2 June 2014, director Fred Schepisi was hired to direct a film adaptation.

References

External links

 Drowsy closes early in the capital – Society of London Theatre, 9 July 2007
The Drowsy Chaperone at the Music Theatre International website
Bob Martin – Downstage Center interview at American Theatre Wing.org, June 2006
Study guide from TUTS

2006 musicals
Broadway musicals
Musicals set in the Roaring Twenties
West End musicals
Original musicals
Theatre in Toronto
One-act musicals
Black comedy plays
Canadian musicals
Tony Award-winning musicals